Les Synthétistes were a group of Belgian composers whose goal was to synthesize the modern musical tendencies starting in 1925. All of them were ex-pupils of the Belgian composer Paul Gilson and started the organization as a way to celebrate their teacher's 60th birthday in 1925. Their first act was to publish the magazine La Revue Musicale Belge. The group longed to be a Belgian counterpart to the famous French composing group Les Six.

The first concert devoted to these synthesists took place in December 1929 and was directed by Constant Moreau. Their first big official concert took place on the 27th of Februari 1930 in the Royal Conservatory of Brussels. It was played by the Groot Harmonieorkest van de Belgische Gidsen and conducted by Arthur Prévost.

Members 

 René Bernier (1905–1984)
 Francis de Bourguignon (1890–1961)
 Gaston Brenta (1902–1969)
 Théo De Joncker (1894–1964)
 Robert Otlet 
 Marcel Poot (1901–1988)
 Maurice Schoemaker (1890–1964)
 Jules Strens (1893–1971).

Sources 
 Francis Pieters, Grootmeesters van de Simfonie en de Blaasmuziek – De Sythetisten, in: FEDEKAMNIEUWS Tweemaandelijks orgaan van de Fedekam Vlaanderen, 27th volume, nr. 3, June 1982, pp. 178–181. (Dutch)
 ‘Poot, Marcel.’ In The Harvard Biographical Dictionary of Music. Ed. By D. M. RANDEL. The Belknap Press of Harvard University Press, 1996, p. 702.

Belgian composers
Composition schools
Music organisations based in Belgium